Orkney is a constituency of the Scottish Parliament (Holyrood) covering the council area of Orkney. It elects one Member of the Scottish Parliament (MSP) by the first past the post method of election. It is also one of eight constituencies in the Highlands and Islands electoral region, which elects seven additional members, in addition to the eight constituency MSPs, to produce a form of proportional representation for the region as a whole.

Orkney has been held by the Liberal Democrats at all elections since the formation of the Scottish Parliament in 1999, with the current MSP being Liam McArthur, who won the seat at the 2007 Scottish Parliament election. The former Deputy First Minister Jim Wallace represented the constituency from 1999 to 2007.

Electoral region 

Orkney is part of the Highlands and Islands electoral region; the other seven constituencies of are Argyll and Bute, Caithness, Sutherland and Ross, Inverness and Nairn, Moray, Na h-Eileanan an Iar, Shetland and Skye, Lochaber and Badenoch.

The region covers most of Argyll and Bute council area, all of the Highland council area, most of the Moray council area, all of the Orkney Islands council area, all of the Shetland Islands council area and all of Na h-Eileanan Siar.

Constituency boundaries and council area 
The Orkney constituency was created at the same time as the Scottish Parliament, in 1999, to cover the Orkney Islands council area. The constituency is protected in law due to its geographical separation from other parts of Scotland, and therefore its boundaries are not subject to review.

In the House of Commons of the Parliament of the United Kingdom (Westminster), the council area is covered by the Orkney and Shetland constituency, which also covers the Shetland Islands council area.

It contains all six of the Orkney Council wards: East Mainland, South Ronaldsay and Burray; Kirkwall East; Kirkwall West and Orphir; North Isles; Stromness and South Isles; West Mainland.

Member of the Scottish Parliament

Election results

2020s

2010s

2000s

1990s

References

External links

Constituencies of the Scottish Parliament
1999 establishments in Scotland
Constituencies established in 1999
Politics of Orkney
Scottish Parliament constituencies and regions 1999–2011
Scottish Parliament constituencies and regions from 2011
Kirkwall